Patrick Martin Verbeek (born May 24, 1964) is a Canadian former professional ice hockey player and current general manager of the Anaheim Ducks of the National Hockey League (NHL). Verbeek played for five teams over a 20-year playing career, earning a Stanley Cup ring with the Dallas Stars in 1999. His nickname, the "Little Ball of Hate", was given to him in 1995 by Glenn Healy after fellow New York Rangers teammate Ray Ferraro was tagged as the "Big Ball of Hate". He is one of few NHL players to have scored 500 goals, but he is one of five eligible of those players to not be a member of the Hockey Hall of Fame.

Playing career
Verbeek grew up in Petrolia, Ontario playing minor hockey before suiting up for the OHA Petrolia Jets Jr.B. club in 1979-80 as a 15-year old.

Verbeek was selected 43rd overall by the New Jersey Devils in the 1982 NHL Entry Draft.  He helped the Devils to their first playoff berth in the 1987–88 season, when he scored what was a club record 46 goals until it was broken in the 2005–06 season by Brian Gionta's 48 goals.

On May 15, 1985, one of Verbeek's thumbs was cut off by an auger in a farming accident. Thanks to his father and brother his thumb was saved, and after extensive rehabilitation, Verbeek returned to hockey. He did not miss any regular-season NHL games because of the injury.

On April 18, 1988, Verbeek cut the leg of Washington Capitals defenseman Rod Langway with his skate. The NHL ruled the incident accidental, but the episode added to the Patrick Division rivalry between Washington and New Jersey.

After the 1988–89 season, the Devils traded him to the Hartford Whalers. In his first season, he led the team in goal scoring and in his second he was named team MVP. In 1991, he made the All-Star team for the first time and in the following season, Verbeek was named the Whalers captain. After a short stint with the Rangers, he signed with the Dallas Stars as a free agent in 1996, where he won his first Stanley Cup in 1999.

During the 1999–2000 season, he signed with the Detroit Red Wings. In Detroit, he passed the 1,000-point mark, scored his 500th goal, and moved into the top 25 in career goal scoring before returning to Dallas for his final NHL season in 2001–02.

Post-playing career
After retirement, he became a part-time color analyst for television broadcasts of Red Wings' road games. Verbeek is the only player in NHL history to total over 500 career goals and 2500 career penalty minutes. He left his position as a broadcaster in September 2006, to become a scout for the Red Wings. Verbeek was later recruited by former teammate, Steve Yzerman, to work as assistant general manager for the Tampa Bay Lightning. Pat Verbeek worked alongside Yzerman for the Lightning for years, until the pair eventually returned to Detroit. On May 6, 2019, Verbeek was named an assistant general manager for the Detroit Red Wings.

Verbeek was named general manager of the Anaheim Ducks on February 3, 2022.

Personal
Verbeek and his wife Dianne have five children. One son, Kyle, and four daughters: Stephanie, Kendall, Haley, & Georgeanne. The family resided in Birmingham, Michigan during his tenure with the Red Wings.

Awards
Member of one Stanley Cup winning team: 1999 with the Dallas Stars
Selected to two NHL All-Star Games: 1991 and 1996

Career statistics

Regular season and playoffs

International

See also
Captain (ice hockey)
List of NHL players with 1,000 points
List of NHL players with 500 goals
List of NHL players with 1,000 games played
List of NHL players with 2,000 career penalty minutes

References

External links

1964 births
Living people
Canadian ice hockey forwards
Canadian people of Dutch descent
Dallas Stars players
Detroit Red Wings announcers
Detroit Red Wings executives
Detroit Red Wings players
Detroit Red Wings scouts
Hartford Whalers captains
Hartford Whalers players
Ice hockey people from Ontario
National Hockey League All-Stars
National Hockey League broadcasters
New Jersey Devils draft picks
New Jersey Devils players
New York Rangers players
Sportspeople from Sarnia
Stanley Cup champions
Sudbury Wolves players
Tampa Bay Lightning executives
Tampa Bay Lightning scouts